George Wilde or George Wylde may refer to:

 George Wylde I (or Wilde; 1550–1616), English lawyer and politician
 George Wylde II (or Wilde; 1594–1650), English lawyer and politician (son of the above)
 George Wilde (bishop) (1610–1665), bishop of Derry
 George Wilde (American football) (1923–1975), American football player

See also
 George Wild (footballer)
 George Wyld (1821-1906), Scottish homeopathic physician and Christian Theosophist